Dessie Glynn (7 June 1928 – 6 January 2017) was a Republic of Ireland  international footballer who played for Drumcondra and Shelbourne in the late 1940s and 1950s, scoring 111 goals in his League of Ireland career. Glynn was also Drumcondra's all-time top goalscorer with 96 goals between 1949 and 1956. Eamon Dunphy described Glynn as "a splendidly versatile centre-forward, a scorer and maker of goals".  
Glynn grew up in Drumcondra, Dublin, was educated at St. Vincent's C.B.S. and worked for the Irish civil service. In 1958 he spent nine months in hospital, suffering from tuberculosis – a condition which effectively ended his playing career. He later coached in New York.

Club career

Early years
As a youth Glynn played for Johnville and was a member of their team that won the FAI Youth Cup in 1945–46. He subsequently played for Clifton United.

Drumcondra
Glynn joined Drumcondra in January 1949 and helped the club win the League of Ireland title in his first season. He was an all rounder and appeared in virtually every position for Drumcondra. He also played in two FAI Cup finals, collecting a winners medal in 1953–54 and a runners-up medal in 1954–55. His teammates in these two finals included, among others, Tim Coffey, Bobby Duffy and Benny Henderson. Glynn scored 96 league goals in eight seasons with Drumcondra and was the club's top scorer in six seasons. He was also the top scorer in the 1950–51 League of Ireland season with 20 goals. In November 1951 Glynn scored five goals in a game against Transport. He scored the fifth from a penalty kick, which according to legend, burst the net and knocked out a seventeen year old fan in the crowd.

Shelbourne
Glynn joined Shelbourne for the 1956–57  season where he again finished as the club top scorer with 12 league goals. He continued to play for Shelbourne until 1958.

International career

League of Ireland XI
In October 1951 Glynn was a member of the League of Ireland XI that lost 9–1 to a Football League XI.

Republic of Ireland
Glynn was capped twice by the Republic of Ireland at senior level. He made his international debut on 17 October 1951 at Dalymount Park in a 3–2 win against West Germany. Together with Florrie Burke, Glynn was one of two League of Ireland players selected for the starting eleven. Glynn scored the winner for the Republic after finishing off a move started by Peter Farrell and Tommy Eglington. Glynn had cancelled his honeymoon in order to make his Republic of Ireland debut. He won his second cap on 25 May 1955 in a 3–1 away win against Norway.

Honours
Drumcondra 
League of Ireland
 1948–49
FAI Cup
 1953–54 
League of Ireland Shield
 1950–51
Dublin City Cup
 1949–50, 1950–51, 1951–52
Leinster Senior Cup
 1949–50, 1953–54
Johnville
FAI Youth Cup
 1945–46: 1
Individual
League of Ireland Top Scorer: 
 1950–51
Source:

References

1928 births
2017 deaths
Republic of Ireland association footballers
Republic of Ireland international footballers
Drumcondra F.C. players
Shelbourne F.C. players
League of Ireland players
League of Ireland XI players
Association footballers from County Dublin
Association football forwards
People educated at St. Vincent's C.B.S., Glasnevin